The Celtic calendar is a compilation of pre-Christian Celtic systems of timekeeping, including the Gaulish Coligny calendar, used by Celtic countries to define the beginning and length of the day, the week, the month, the seasons, quarter days, and festivals.

Continental Celtic calendar
The Gaulish Coligny calendar is the oldest known Celtic solar-lunar ritual calendar. It was discovered in Coligny, France, and is now on display in the Palais des Arts Gallo-Roman museum, Lyon. It dates from the end of the second century CE, when the Roman Empire imposed the use of the Julian Calendar in Roman Gaul. The calendar was originally a single huge plate, but it survives only in fragments. It is inscribed in Gaulish with Latin characters and uses Roman numerals.

The Coligny Calendar reconciles the cycles of the moon and sun. The Coligny calendar considers the phases of the moon to be important, and each month always begins with the same moon phase. The calendar uses a mathematical arrangement to keep a normal 12 month calendar in sync with the moon and keeps the whole system in sync by adding an intercalary month every  years. The Coligny calendar registers a five-year cycle of 62 lunar months, divided into a "bright" and a "dark" fortnight (or half a moon cycle) each. The internal notations show that the months began with the first quarter moon, and a 13th intercalary month was added every two and a half years to align the lunations with the solar year.

The astronomical format of the calendar year that the Coligny calendar represents may well be far older, as calendars are usually even more conservative than rites and cults. The date of its inception is unknown, but correspondences of Insular Celtic and Continental Celtic calendars suggest that some early form may date to Proto-Celtic times, roughly 800 B.C. The Coligny calendar achieves a complex synchronisation of the solar and lunar months. Whether it does this for philosophical or practical reasons, it points to a considerable degree of sophistication.

Medieval Irish and Welsh calendars

Among the Insular Celts, the year was divided into a light half and a dark half. As the day was seen as beginning at sunset, so the year was seen as beginning with the arrival of the darkness, at Calan Gaeaf / Samhain (around 1 November in the modern calendar). The light half of the year started at Calan Haf/Bealtaine (around 1 May, modern calendar). This observance of festivals beginning the evening before the festival day is still seen in the celebrations and folkloric practices among the Gaels, such as the traditions of Oíche Shamhna (Samhain Eve) among the Irish and Oidhche Shamhna among the Scots.

Julius Caesar said in his Gallic Wars: "[the Gaulish Celts] keep birthdays and the beginnings of months and years in such an order that the day follows the night." Longer periods were reckoned in nights, as in the surviving English term fortnight meaning two weeks, and the obsolete se'nnight meaning one week.

The Laws of Hywel Dda  (in editions surviving from the 12th and 13th centuries)  make repeated references to periods of nine days (nawfed dydd), rather than the "eight nights" that make up the current word wythnos.

Native calendar terms in Celtic languages
Many calendrical and time-keeping terms used in the medieval and modern Celtic languages were borrowed from Latin and reflect the influence of Roman culture and Christianity on the Insular Celts. The words borrowed include the month names Januarius (Old Irish , Irish Eanáir, Welsh ), Februarius (Old Irish , Irish Feabhra, Welsh ), Martius (Old Irish , Welsh ), Aprilius (Old Irish , Irish Aibreán, Welsh ), Maius (Welsh ), Augustus (Old Irish , Welsh ); the names for the days of the week, Solis, Lunae, Martis, Mercurii, Jovis, Veneris, Saturni; the terms septimana "week" (Old Irish , Breton , Cornish ), kalendae "first day of the month" (Old Irish , Welsh , Breton ), tempore "time" (Welsh ), matutina "morning" (Cornish , Irish maidin), vespera "evening", nona "noon" (Welsh , Irish nóin), and ôra "hour" (Welsh , Breton , Irish uair).

A number of native Celtic terms survived the adoption of the Roman/Christian calendar, however:

In Neopaganism
In some Neopagan religions, a "Celtic calendar" loosely based on that of Medieval Ireland is observed for purposes of ritual. Adherents of Reconstructionist traditions may celebrate the four Gaelic festivals of Samhain, Imbolc, Beltane, and Lughnasadh.

Some eclectic Neopagans, such as Wiccans, combine the Gaelic fire festivals with solstices and equinox celebrations derived from non-Celtic cultures to produce the Wiccan modern Wheel of the Year. Some eclectic Neopagans are also influenced by Robert Graves' "Celtic Tree Calendar", which has no foundation in historical calendars or actual ancient Celtic Astrology, instead being derived from Graves' extrapolation of The Song of Amergin.

See also
Coligny calendar
Gaelic calendar (Irish calendar)
Welsh holidays

References

Further reading
 
 
 
 
 
 
 
 
  (reprint of 1904 ed.)
 
 
 
 
 
 
 
 

Calendar
Calendar
Irish culture
Specific calendars